National Highway 133B, commonly referred to as NH 133B is a national highway in  India. It is a spur road of National Highway 33. NH-333B traverses the states of Jharkhand and Bihar in India.

Project cost 
The estimated development cost of this new national highway is ₹1,954.77 crores including 6 km long Manihari bypass road. This also includes cost of land acquisition, resettlement and rehabilitation and other pre-construction activities.

Route 

 Jharkhand

Sahibganj (NH-33)- Bihar Border.

 Bihar

Manihari, Darbhanga, Mehsi

Sahibganj-Manihari Ganga bridge 
This short national highway will connects these two cities via a 4 lane bridge across river Ganga. The foundation stone of this bridge was laid on 6 April 2017, by prime minister of India.

Junctions 

  Terminal near Sahibganj.
  Terminal near Mehsi.

See also 

 List of National Highways in India
 List of National Highways in India by state

References

External links 

 Government approves Rs 1,955-cr road link project

National highways in India
National Highways in Bihar
National Highways in Jharkhand